3960X may refer to:
AMD Ryzen Threadripper 3960X, computer processor released in 2019
Intel Core i7-3960X, computer processor released in 2011